The American Flea Ship (Flea Triplane) is a homebuilt triplane design of the early 1930s. It is one of the first examples of a female-designed-and-built aircraft. One example is displayed at the Wings of a Dream Museum.

Development
The American Flea Ship is a homebuilt triplane variant of the French-designed Mignet Flea licensed by American Mignet Aircraft, and later Universal Aircraft company of Ft Worth, Texas. It is also known as the Flea Triplane. The aircraft was given away by Universal as a marketing effort when a Universal motor was purchased to power it. Later, the fuselage sold for $695. The kit version of the aircraft was designed by Lillian Holden. Ace Aircraft Manufacturing Company maintains the rights to the American Flea Ship and Heath Parasol.

Design
The Triplane aircraft does not have ailerons, and uses variable incidence wings for roll control.

Variants
The aircraft has been referenced under many names including; 
American Flea Ship
Mignet HM-20
HM-20 Flying Flea
Flea Triplane
TC-1 Flea (1954)

Specifications American Flea Ship

Notes

References

Homebuilt aircraft
Triplanes
Single-engined tractor aircraft
1930s United States sport aircraft
Flea Ship